Marcos Caplán (15 March 1905 – 3 October 1979) was an Argentine stage and film actor.

Selected filmography
 Paths of Faith (1938)
 Lucrezia Borgia (1947)

References

Bibliography 
 Finkielman, Jorge. The Film Industry in Argentina: An Illustrated Cultural History. McFarland, 2003.

External links 
 

1905 births
1979 deaths
Argentine male film actors
Argentine male stage actors
Jewish Argentine male actors
Male actors from Buenos Aires
20th-century Argentine male actors